Saaya is an Indian soap opera aired on Sony Entertainment Television in 1998. The series was produced by popular production house, UTV Software Communications and revolved around two very different girls – Sudha (Manasi Joshi Roy) and Kamiya (Achint Kaur) who become friends.

Premise 
Sudha is a quiet, fragile and an incredibly shy girl who comes from an orthodox family where her father Jagat Narayan has the final say. Kamiya, on the other hand, is bursting with a vibrant zest for life and is an extroverted, confident young girl from a modern family.

Sudha and Kamiya meet in college and become best friends always there to support each other through the rough times until things change between them.

Cast

Manasi Joshi Roy as Sudha
Achint Kaur as Kamiya
R. Madhavan as Shekhar
Amar Talwar as Mr Mehra, Tanya father
Manju Vyas as Mrs Mehra, Tanya mother
Karan Oberoi as Karan Mehra
Nitesh Pandey as Manoj
Prakash Ramchandani 
Harsh Chhaya as Bhaskar Sir
Mandeep Bhandar as Bhaskar wife
Rajendra Gupta as Jagat Narayan, Sudha's father
Savita Prabhune as Sudha's mother
Pamela Mukherjee as Sudha's sister
Anup Soni as Prakash, Sudha's brother
Loveleen Mishra as Prakash wife
Shrivallabh Vyas as Sinha, Shekar father
Shreechand Makhija as college principal 
Lalit Parimoo as Police Inspector Makhija 
Shishir Sharma as Chief Editor Krishnamurthi
Daya Shankar Pandey as Assistant Editor Pandey
Rajesh Khera as Ranvir Rastogi
Varun Vardhan as ad agency owner of Eazyclean washing powder (Episodes 20 to 25)
Vaquar Shaikh as Arnav Nanda
Dinesh Kaushik as Ranvir Rastogi promoting partner. (Special Appearance) Episodes No 41 to 45
Murli Sharma as Malik (Special Appearance Episode 114,115)

References

External links
Saaya Official Site on Sony TV
Watch Saaya on YouTube

Indian television soap operas
Sony Entertainment Television original programming
1990s Indian television series
UTV Television